The Young Women's Christian Association is a historic building in Helena, Montana, U.S.. It was built for the local YWCA chapter in 1918, and designed by architect Chester H. Kirk. It has been listed on the National Register of Historic Places since December 27, 1984.

References

Buildings and structures completed in 1918
National Register of Historic Places in Helena, Montana
YWCA buildings
1918 establishments in Montana
History of women in Montana
Clubhouses on the National Register of Historic Places in Montana
Bungalow architecture in Montana